Electric is the fourteenth studio album by Richard Thompson, released in 2013.

Overview
The album was recorded in Buddy Miller's home in Nashville in May 2012. Thompson took his stripped down "electric trio" band (himself, bass player Taras Prodaniuk and drummer Michael Jerome) to the sessions. Miller produced, played some rhythm guitar parts and brought in some local players to augment the trio, notably Stuart Duncan and Siobhan Maher Kennedy. The bulk of the recording was finished in two weeks, with Miller overdubbing Alison Krauss's vocal parts on "The Snow Goose" later on.

The tracks were recorded on 16-track tape before being digitized for further manipulation in Pro-Tools.

Release
Following its release, the album peaked at number 16 on the UK Album Chart and number 75 on the Billboard 200, making it the highest-charting album of Thompson's career in either country.

Track listing
All songs written by Richard Thompson, except "So Ben Mi Ch'a Bon Temp" (written by Vecchi, arranged by Thompson):

 "Stony Ground" - 4:42
 "Salford Sunday" - 4:08
 "Sally B" - 4:04
 "Stuck On The Treadmill" - 4:20
 "My Enemy" - 5:37
 "Good Things Happen To Bad People" - 5:21
 "Where's Home?" - 3:30
 "Another Small Thing In Her Favour" - 5:06
 "Straight And Narrow" - 4:13
 "The Snow Goose" - 5:06
 "Saving The Good Stuff For You" - 3:54

A Deluxe Edition with a bonus disc was also made available. The bonus disc contains four outtakes from the 'Electric' sessions and three additional tracks
from other Thompson albums

 "Will You Dance, Charlie Boy"
 "I Found A Stray"
 "The Rival"
 "The Tic-Tac Man"
 "Auldie Riggs" (from Cabaret Of Souls)
 "Auldie Riggs Dance" (from Cabaret Of Souls)
 "So Ben Mi Ch'a Bon Tempo" (from 1000 Years of Popular Music)

Personnel

 Musical

 Richard Thompson - vocals, guitar, mandolin, hurdy-gurdy, accordion, electronic organ
 Michael Jerome - drums, vocals
 Taras Prodaniuk - electric bass guitar, vocals, mandocello
 Buddy Miller - guitar
 Siobhan Maher Kennedy - backing vocals on tracks 2, 5, 7, 9 and 11
 Stuart Duncan - fiddle
 Alison Krauss - backing vocals on track 10
 Dennis Crouch - bass
 Debra Dobkin - percussion on tracks 2-5 and 2-6

 Technical

 Buddy Miller - mixing, production
 Mike Poole - recording
 Ray Kennedy - mastering
 George Ingram - mastering for vinyl edition

References

2013 albums
Richard Thompson (musician) albums
Proper Records albums
Albums produced by Buddy Miller